Jayakodige Dona Rathna Lalani (born 8 January 1964 as  [Sinhala]), popularly as Rathna Lalani Jayakody, is an actress in Sri Lankan cinema, theatre and television. She is a teacher by profession.

Personal life
Rathna Lalani Jayakody was born on 8 January 1964 as the youngest of the family. Her father is an Ayurvedic doctor. She went to Siddhartha Maha Vidyalaya, Sedawatta and then attended to Kolonnawa Balika Vidyalaya. She has two elder brothers, two elder sisters – Geetha Kanthi and Sriyani. Geetha Kanthi is also a renowned award-winning actress in Sri Lankan cinema, theatre and television. Popular actor Bimal Jayakody is the son of Rathna's elder brother. Bimal is married to fellow actress Sujani Menaka. Popular actress Paboda Sandeepani is the daughter of her sister Geetha Kanthi.

Rathna Lalani is married to fellow actor Sampath Tennakoon. They first met during a stage drama Puthra Samagama and then in Suba Sandewak. They have acted more than 50 stage dramas together.

She is currently working as a teacher in Sri Rajasinghe Madya Maha Vidyalaya.

Acting career
Before starting acting career, Jayakody joined with Sri Lanka Broadcasting Coorporation for Lama Pitiya program with her sister Geetha Kanthi. In 1985, she acted in the stage play Julius Caesar produced by Tony Ranasinghe where she became the one and only Gamini Fonseka's only girlfriend on stage. She was selected for many dramas due to her voice best suited for Noorthi and stage drama songs. She acted under the prominent directors such as Ananda Sirisena, Agnes Sirisena, Mahinda Algama, Ashoka Tillakaratne and Piyadasa Ranasinghe to polish her abilities. Her maiden television acting came through Parakrama Niriella's Laa Hiru Dahasak. Her role as Ranjani in the teledrama Yashorawaya was critically acclaimed. She also acted in Verona, and Hathara Wate

In 1991, a drama festival named Ratna Lalani Drama Festival was held. In 2013, Rathna and Sampath organised a drama festival titled Abhinayana Sampath-Rathna Rangabhumika to celebrate their 30 years in stage drama career. They staged seven popular dramas from 17 to 23 December 2013 at New Town Hall, Colombo 7, which they together acted.

Selected stage dramas

 Vaneesiye Welenda
 Thunmansala
 Suba Sandewak
 Maname
 Mayadevi
 Puthra Samagama
 Guru Tharuwa
 Jagan Ma
 Romaya Gini Gani
 Thalamala Pipila
 Andarela
 Deseeya Thunseeya
 Mala Walalu

Filmography
Her maiden cinematic experience came through a minor role in 1986 film Pooja, directed by Dharmasiri Gamage. Some of her popular films are Awaragira, Randiya Dahara and Pooja.

References

External links
 Rohana Siriwardena to enchant fans on Sep. 28
 අසිරිමත් රඟ මඬල පති පතිනි භූමිකා
 මගෙ බෙල්ල ළඟට වතුර

Living people
Sri Lankan film actresses
1964 births